is a railway station on the Tadami Line in Aizumisato, Fukushima Prefecture, Japan, operated by East Japan Railway Company (JR East).

Lines
Niitsuru Station is served by the Tadami Line, and is located 16.8 rail kilometers from the official starting point of the line at Aizu-Wakamatsu Station.

Station layout
Niitsuru Station has a single side platform serving traffic in both directions. The station is unattended.

History
The station was absorbed into the JR East network upon the privatization of the JNR on April 1, 1987. A new station building was completed in March 2000.

Surrounding area
Aizu-Misato Elementary School
Aizu-Misato Middle School
Niitsuru Post Office

References

External links
 JR East Station information 

Railway stations in Fukushima Prefecture
Tadami Line
Railway stations in Japan opened in 1926